Čeľovce is a village and municipality in the Trebišov District in the Košice Region of eastern Slovakia. Former Royal Hungarian town in the Kingdom of Hungary.

History
In historical records the village was first mentioned in 1220.

Geography
The village lies at an altitude of 143 metres and covers an area of 13.269 km².
It has a population of about 530 people.

Ethnicity
The village is about 99% Hungarian.

Facilities
The village has a public library, a cinema and a football pitch.

Genealogical resources

The records for genealogical research are available at the state archive "Statny Archiv in Kosice, Slovakia"

 Roman Catholic church records (births/marriages/deaths): 1723–1896 (parish B)
 Greek Catholic church records (births/marriages/deaths): 1812–1909 (parish A)
 Reformated church records (births/marriages/deaths): 1756–1952 (parish B)

See also
 List of municipalities and towns in Slovakia

External links
http://www.statistics.sk/mosmis/eng/run.html
http://www.celovce.sk
Surnames of living people in Celovce

Villages and municipalities in Trebišov District
Zemplín (region)